was the 6th Naitō daimyō of Murakami Domain under the Edo period Tokugawa shogunate of Japan. Nobuatsu was the eldest son of Naitō Nobuyori. the previous daimyō. He was born in Edo, and became daimyō in 1781 on the death of his father. In the year 1800 he was appointed a sōshaban and rose to the post of Jisha-bugyō in 1813. in 1817, he was appointed a wakadoshiyori followed by Kyoto Shoshidai in 1823. He died while in office in Kyoto in 1825. His wife was a daughter of Yanagisawa Yasumitsu of Yamato-Kōriyama Domain. He later remarried to a daughter of Matsudaira Sadanobu of Shirakawa Domain.

|-

1777 births
1825 deaths
Fudai daimyo
Wakadoshiyori
Kyoto Shoshidai
Naitō clan